Cimarron-class oiler may refer to either of two classes of oilers.

 , were built before and during World War II and served into the 1970s, in some cases until the Gulf War.
 , a faster multi-function refueling ship with helicopter support